Petite Terre or Petite-Terre (French for "small land") may refer to:

 Petite Terre Islands, in Guadeloupe
 Petite Terre Islands National Nature Reserve
 Pamanzi, also known as Petite-Terre, the second largest island in Mayotte